Álvarez is a town (comuna) in the province of Santa Fe, Argentina.

The town was founded on 7 July 1890 by Justina Rodríguez, the young widow of Nicolás María Álvarez, the owner of an estancia (ranch) surrounded by a small populated settlement. It was first managed by her son Bernardino, until 1902, when an administrative commission was formally appointed by the provincial governor.

References
 
 Álvarez Web — Official website.

Populated places in Santa Fe Province